Carcinocorini are a tribe of ambush bugs which are distinct in have a claw-like modification of the foreleg used to capture their prey. Such claw or chelae, which are common in crabs, are almost unknown in insects, present only in female wasps of the family Dryinidae. The name of the tribe is derived from the Greek karkinos for crab and coris for bug.

References

Reduviidae
Insect tribes